Hasta Abajo may refer to:

"Hasta Abajo" (Don Omar song), 2009
"Hasta Abajo" (Yandel song), 2013
"Hasta Abajo", a song by Kevin Roldán, 2020